Metropolis is a surname. Notable people with the surname include:

 Daniel Metropolis (born 1972), Australian rules footballer
 Nicholas Metropolis (1915–1999), Greek American physicist
 Peter Metropolis (born 1944), Australian rules footballer and administrator